Guido Santin (1 January 1911 – 1 August 2008) was an Italian rower who competed in the 1936 Summer Olympics.

He was born and died in Cavallino-Treporti.

In 1936 he won the silver medal as crew member of the Italian boat in the coxed pair event.

References

External links
 Notice of Guido Santin's death

1911 births
2008 deaths
Italian male rowers
Olympic rowers of Italy
Rowers at the 1936 Summer Olympics
Olympic silver medalists for Italy
Sportspeople from the Metropolitan City of Venice
Olympic medalists in rowing
Medalists at the 1936 Summer Olympics
European Rowing Championships medalists